= Valentin Tublin =

Valentin Solomonovich Tublin (Russian: Валенти́н Соломо́нович Тублин; May 23, 1934, Leningrad, USSR – 6 September 2026) is a Soviet and Israeli coach in archery, writer. Coach Israeli Olympic team archery (1991-1996).
